Juan Manuel Mazzocchi (born 8 June 1997) is an Argentine footballer who plays for Spanish club Albacete Balompié B on loan from Villa Dálmine as a forward.

Club career
Born in Baradero, Buenos Aires, Mazzocchi represented Villa Dálmine as a youth. On 18 June 2016 he made his first team debut, coming on as a second-half substitute and scoring his team's third in a 4–1 Primera B Nacional home routing of Sportivo Estudiantes.

Mazzocchi started to feature regularly during the 2016–17 season, scoring four goals in 35 matches. On 24 January 2018 he moved abroad, signing for Spanish club Albacete Balompié and immediately assigned to the reserves in Tercera División.

References

External links

1997 births
Living people
People from Baradero
Argentine footballers
Association football forwards
Primera Nacional players
Villa Dálmine footballers
Tercera División players
Atlético Albacete players
Argentine expatriate footballers
Argentine expatriate sportspeople in Spain
Expatriate footballers in Spain
Sportspeople from Buenos Aires Province